Léon-Joseph Raymond OBE, (30 July 1901 – 24 August 1993) was a Canadian politician, serving as mayor of Maniwaki, Quebec in 1941 and 1942 and as a Liberal party member of the House of Commons of Canada from 1945 to 1949.

Raymond was born at Napierville, Quebec and was educated at Saint-Remi College, the Joliette Seminary and at the University of Montreal where he received his Bachelor of Arts degree. He became a notary and from 1941 to 1945 served as vice-president of the Chambers of Commerce Unionm and from 1938 to 1945 as President of the school commission of Maniwaki.

He married Clementine Péclet on 1 July 1930.

He was first elected to Parliament at the Wright riding in the 1945 general election. With riding boundary changes, Raymond entered the 1949 federal election at the new Gatineau riding and won the seat. He was appointed Clerk of the House of Commons on 5 August 1949 and resigned his seat in Parliament.

References

External links
 

1901 births
1993 deaths
Liberal Party of Canada MPs
Mayors of places in Quebec
Members of the House of Commons of Canada from Quebec
Université de Montréal alumni
Clerks of the House of Commons (Canada)
People from Maniwaki